Peter S. Dokuchitz (March 9, 1928 – July 20, 2014) was an American politician who served in the New York State Assembly from the 113th district from 1973 to 1978.

He died on July 20, 2014, in Oneonta, New York at age 86.

References

1928 births
2014 deaths
People from Oneonta, New York
Republican Party members of the New York State Assembly